Los Negros Rural LLG is a local-level government (LLG) of Manus Province, Papua New Guinea.

Wards
01. Loniu
02. Lolak
03. Lombrum
04. Papitalai
05. Naringel
06. Riuriu
07. Salamei Settlement
08. Mokareng
81. Lombrum Naval Base

References

Local-level governments of Manus Province